The 2009–10 AWIHL season is the third season of the Australian Women's Ice Hockey League. It ran from 17 October 2009 until 14 February 2010.

Regular season
The regular season begins on 17 October 2009 and will run through to 14 February 2010

October

November

December

Standings
Note: GP = Games played; W = Wins; L = Losses; T = Ties; GF = Goals for; GA = Goals against; GDF = Goal differential; PTS = Points

Win = 2 pts
Tie = 1 pt
Loss = 0 pts

The regular season league standings are as follows:

See also

Ice Hockey Australia
Joan McKowen Memorial Trophy

References

External links 
Australian Women's Hockey League official site
Adelaide Adrenaline official site
Brisbane Goannas official site
Melbourne Ice official Site
Sydney Sirens

Australian Women's Ice Hockey League seasons
Aust
ice hockey
ice hockey